OpenEDR is an open-source initiative started by Xcitium. OpenEDR is a platform that analyzes at base-security-event level and generates reports for IT staff members. 

The source code is open source and available on GitHub.

Components

 Runtime components 
 System Monitor 
 File-system mini-filter
 Low-level process monitoring component
 Low-level registry monitoring component
 Self-protection provider
 Network monitor

References

Security software
Free and open-source software